Salimullah Khan (born 18 August 1958) is a Bangladeshi writer. Khan explores national and international politics and culture using Marxist and Lacanian theories. Informed and influenced by Ahmed Sofa's thoughts, his exploration of Bangladesh's politics and culture has a significant following among the country's young generation of writers and thinkers. Khan translated the works of Plato, James Rennell, Charles Baudelaire, Frantz Fanon, Dorothee Sölle into Bengali. In Bangladesh, he is a regular guest in talk shows on national and international political issues.

Biography
Born in Cox's Bazar, Khan grew up in Maheshkhali. Passing his SSC from Chattogram Cantonment High School and HSC from Chattogram College, he studied Law at the University of Dhaka. For a brief period, he was involved with the student wing of Jatiya Samajtantrik Dal. In 1986, he went to the United States, and did his PhD on Theories of Central Banking in England, 1793-1877 at the New School.

Academic career 
Khan taught at the Department of Law, University of Rajshahi from 1983 to 1984, at the Institute of Business Administration, University of Dhaka from 1985 to 1986, and East West University from 2001 to 2002. He was Fellow at SOAS, University of London and Stockholm University. In 2006, he joined Stamford University Bangladesh, Bangladesh as a Professor in the Department of Law. Khan edited a periodical titled Praxis Journal from 1979 to 1986.

Khan is currently the director of Centre for Advanced Theory at University of Liberal Arts Bangladesh. He is associated with a number of organisations such as Center for Asian Arts and Cultures, Ahmed Sofa RashtraSabha, etc.

Writing career

A proponent of anti-colonial movements, Khan has engagements in the regional political economy and culture from a Lacanian-Marxist perspective. A critic of Western interventionism, Salimullah Khan analyzes Western thought and discourse through critical scrutiny of the colonial and imperial legacy of the West. From this perspective, he has written on the works of Charles Baudelaire, Walter Benjamin, Michel Foucault, Frantz Fanon, Claude Lévi-Strauss, Edward Said, Aime Cesaire, Talal Asad and many others. Since 1997, his engagement with Freud and Lacan has made him use psychoanalysis to explore Bangladesh's politics and culture and also international issues. He also wrote two books on Freudo-Lacanian philosophy: Freud Porar Bhumika, and Ami Tumi She.

Critiques 
Khan's first book Bangladesh: Jatiyo Obosthar Chalchitro (1983) was a critique of Abdur Razzaq's famous lecture: Bangladesh: State of the Nation. Upon publication, it came under censure of Ahmed Sofa. Salimullah Khan wrote on Lalon Shah, Ramaprasad Chanda, Jasimuddin, Roquia Sakhawat Hussain, Ahmed Sofa, Abul Hasan, Tareque Masud and some of his contemporaries.

Khan views Kazi Nazrul Islam as an anti-colonial and democratic thinker cherished dearly by the people of Bengal.  His book Ahmed Sofa Shanjibani provides an expansive assessment of the works of Ahmed Sofa. It established him as the leading expert on Sofa. He also edited a collection of writings by Ahmed Sofa on Rabindranath Tagore.

In a 2011 debate arranged by bdnews24.com, Khan critiqued the portrayal of the Bangladesh Liberation War in the film Meherjaan.

Political views 

In his book Behat Biplab, Salimullah Khan analyzed the strategic and political aspects of the liberation war of Bangladesh. In Khan's view, the three fundamental principles of the liberation war of Bangladesh are equality, human dignity, and social justice.

During the Shahbagh Movement in Dhaka, Khan came forward in strong support of the war crime trial. He has intervened in recent debates on the number of martyrs in the Liberation War of Bangladesh.

Khan advocates for an inclusive education system in Bangladesh. In April 2017, as the government of Bangladesh took the decision to recognize the Dawra degree of the Qawmi madrasa system, Khan hailed the decision as important for integration of Qawmi group into the national mainstream. He discussed how Islam was propagated in Bengal through the medium of Bengali language.

Khan analyzes the issue of communalism and extremism from a historical perspective. and locates the origin of communalism in South Asia in the British colonial period. His analysis of communalism has also touched upon the Rohingya question, He denounced communal attacks and suggests that upholding social justice is critical to drive away communalism from the national arena. He defends equal right of all communities to observe respective religions. Proper education and guidance is critical to dissuade the young generation from going down the path of extremism.

Views on Bengali as a medium of education 

Khan is a leading advocate of Bengali to be the main medium of education in the Bangladeshi academia.  He opined that without establishing Bengali as the main medium of education in all stages, the decolonization process would lag behind, and the Anglocentric colonial cringe would persist in the social dynamics in Bangladesh. In Bangladesh, the ruling class albeit admits Bengali to be the state language, their preference for English is apparent in their language application. Citing Freud and Lacan, he wrote that the people of the ruling class are pervert since their acts and thoughts do not reflect their words. He also called them traitors to the nation. Quoting a French proverb with puns in Bengali, he stated that until Bengali is not the medium of education in higher studies, the quality of education would stay medium, and in the realm of education, medium (quality) equals low. Compromise with the medium of language thus means the demise of quality in the domain of education, impeding progress of the nation as a whole. He also said that second languages should be taught to complement Bengali, not to supersede it.

Khan is a vocal critic of certain prescriptions on Bengali orthography. In his opinion, Bangla Academy has failed to perform its duty in publication of advanced knowledge in Bengali language.

Controversy and criticism 
Khan was criticized for his use of Sadhu Bhasha. His writings were labelled incomprehensible and impenetrable.

Selected works 
Essays
 Bangladesh: Jatiya Abasthar Chalchitra (1983)
 Freud Porar Bhumika, Ed. (2005)
 Satya Saddam Hussein and ‘Srajerdaula’ (2007)
 Behat Biplap 1971, Ed. (2007)
 Ami Tumi Se (2008)
 Silence: On Crimes of Power (2009)
 Adamboma (2009)
 Ahmed Sofa Sanjibani (2010)
 Swadhinata Byabsay (2011)
 Ahmed Sofar Swadesh, Ed. (2015)
 Gariber Rabindranath, Ed. (2017)
 Prarthana (2019)
 আমাদের ভাষার নায়ক (2020)

Poetry
 Ek Akasher Swapna (1981)

Translations
 Allahr Badshahi: Selected Poems of Dorothee Sölle (1998)
 Collected Works of Plato, V. 1 (2005) (Co-translated)

Awards
Loke Literary Award: 2017
Ranajit Award: 2020

References

External links

1958 births
Living people
21st-century Bangladeshi writers
Bangladeshi non-fiction writers
Bangladeshi male writers
Writers from Dhaka
People from Cox's Bazar District
Academic staff of the University of Rajshahi
Academic staff of the University of Liberal Arts Bangladesh
University of Dhaka alumni
Academic staff of the University of Dhaka
State University of New York at Purchase faculty
City University of New York faculty
The New School alumni
20th-century Bengalis
21st-century Bengalis
Male non-fiction writers
Stamford University Bangladesh